HMS Holderness was a Type I  destroyer of the Royal Navy which served in World War II. She was scrapped in 1956.

Service history
Holderness was ordered on 21 March 1939 under the 1939 Programme. She was laid down on 29 June 1939 at Swan Hunter, launched on 8 February 1940 and completed on 10 August 1940. The whole of her wartime service was with the 21st Destroyer Flotilla escorting east coast convoys. She saw no foreign service.

On 20 February 1942 she was engaged in an action with German Schnellboote sinking one of them and taking 18 prisoners.

She was adopted by the civil community of Amman Valley in Wales as part of Warship Week in 1942.

She earned battle honours during the Second World War for the North Sea 1942–1945.

Following the war she was transferred to the Reserve Fleet at Harwich in 1946. She remained there until sold to Thos. W. Ward for scrap. She arrived at the breakers yard in Preston on 20 November 1956.

References

Publications
 
 

1940 ships
Hunt-class destroyers of the Royal Navy
Naval ships of Operation Neptune